is a Japanese manga series written and illustrated by Megumu Okada. The series has been adapted into four original video animations released from 1995 to 1996 and an anime adaptation produced by Studio Deen aired on TV Tokyo in 1998.

In North America, the OVAs have been released by Manga Entertainment and the anime television series was distributed by ADV Films.

Plot

Shadow Skill takes place in the warrior kingdom of Kurda, where the main character Elle Regu has recently become the 59th Sevaar, a title awarded to their most elite warriors. She often leaves a trail of destruction when she fights and along with a drinking habit. Elle is constantly followed by debts and throughout the series takes on jobs to work off these debts. One of these such jobs leads her to the Green Octopus Inn on an island outside the city, which eventually becomes the protagonists' base of operation.

Throughout the series, Elle travels along with her adopted younger brother Gau Ban, who is studying Elle's fighting skills so that one day he could become the greatest Sevaar in Kurda.  Also in Elle and Gau's life is Faulink Maya (Faulee), a Sui Rame talisman sorceress, and Kyuo Liu, a Septia beast-catcher and grandniece of Eva Stroll, the king of Kurda.

Warriors in Kurda fight using the Kurdan-style Kōsappō (交殺法, lit. "combining kill methods", ADV dub: "annihilation techniques") which has two general divisions: Hyōgi (表技, lit. "bright skills"), which emphasize punches and throws, and Eigi (影技, lit. "shadow skills"), which focus on kicks and the user's footwork.

Media

Manga
The Shadow Skill manga series was originally created by Megumu Okada as a self-published dōjinshi. In 1992, it was picked up by Takeshobo for serialization in its shōnen magazine Comic Gamma. The magazine ceased publication in 1996; a total of four tankōbon (bound volumes) collecting the manga's chapters were released during that time. Shadow Skill was carried over by publisher Fujimi Shobo in its magazine Monthly Dragon Jr. until 1998; another four volumes were released by that publisher. Kodansha then gained the rights to Shadow Skill and released the existing chapters in three large aizōban volumes from 1999 to 2000. The following year, Okada began regularly publishing new chapters in the publisher's seinen magazine Afternoon Season Zōkan, and later in Monthly Afternoon and Good Afternoon. Okada took a hiatus from the manga in 2006, but continued in 2009, submitting new chapters every other month, until finishing the series in 2014. In total, the Kodansha released the entire Shadow Skill manga in three aizōban and an additional 11 tankōbon.

Anime

OVAs
There have been a number of anime productions based on the Shadow Skill manga. It was first adapted into an original video animation (OVA) by Zero-G Room and released in Japan on October 25, 1995. Three additional OVA episodes were produced and released from September 21 to November 21, 1996. The first volume was officially numbered "volume 2.5" in Japan due to its chronological place among the four episodes. All four OVAs were licensed in North America and the United Kingdom by Manga Entertainment. The latter three episodes were compiled and released in English-speaking regions as Shadow Skill: The Movie, while the first OVA was later released as Shadow Skill: The Origin. Finally, a single cel shaded, CGI animation OVA titled  was produced by Tandm and released in Japan on October 2, 2004.

TV series
A 26-episode television series titled  was produced by Studio Deen and aired on TV Tokyo from July 2 to December 24, 1998. ADV Films licensed the series in the United States.

Reception
Anime News Network praised the series' Japanese and English voice acting, saying they did a good job capturing the light-hearted tone of the series.  However, they felt the series stuck to the conventions of the martial arts genre with the plot focusing on fight scenes and the elaborate named moves being shouted aloud as they "powered up".  As such, they thought that Shadow Skill appeals primarily to fans of the genre, but it was unlikely to appeal to viewers outside that fanbase.  THEM Anime Reviews described the OVA series as "well executed" and "fun to watch". But they advised that Shadow Skill would mainly appeal to fans of the martial arts genre and that it lacked the story development and characterization needed to truly become a great anime.

Notes

References

External links
 

1992 manga
1995 anime OVAs
1998 anime television series debuts
ADV Films
Martial arts anime and manga
Seinen manga
Shōnen manga
Takeshobo manga
Fujimi Shobo manga
Kodansha manga
Studio Deen
Madman Entertainment anime